Rubem Fonseca (May 11, 1925 – April 15, 2020) was a Brazilian writer.

Life and career

He was born in Juiz de Fora, in the state of Minas Gerais, but he lived most of his life in Rio de Janeiro. In 1952, he started his career as a low-level cop and, later became a police commissioner, one of the highest ranks in the civil police of Brazil. Following the steps of American novelist Thomas Pynchon, a close friend of Fonseca, he refused to give interviews and felt strongly about maintaining his privacy.

His stories are dark and gritty, filled with violence and sexual content, and usually set in an urban environment. He claimed a writer should have the courage to show what most people are afraid to say. His work is considered groundbreaking in Brazilian literature , up until then mostly focused on rural settings and usually treating cities with less interest. Almost all Brazilian contemporary writers acknowledge Fonseca's importance. Authors from the rising generation of Brazilian writers, such as Patrícia Melo or Luiz Ruffato, have stated that Fonseca's writing has influenced their work.

He started his career by writing short stories, considered by some critics as his strongest literary creations. His first popular novel was A Grande Arte (High Art), but "Agosto" is usually considered his best work.  One recurring character in Fonseca's books is the lawyer-detective Mandrake.

In 2003, he won the Camões Prize, considered to be the most important award in the Portuguese language.

In 2012, he became the first recipient of Chile's Manuel Rojas Ibero-American Narrative Award.

He died in Rio de Janeiro in April 2020 at the age of 94, just 26 days before his 95th birthday.

Bibliography

Brazilian editions

Novels and novellas
O Caso Morel (1973)
A Grande Arte (1983)
 Bufo & Spallanzani (1986)
Vastas Emoções e Pensamentos Imperfeitos (1988)
Agosto (1990)
O Selvagem da Ópera (1994)
Do Meio do Mundo Prostituto Só Amores Guardei ao Meu Charuto (1997, novella)
O doente Molière (2000, novella)
Diário de um Fescenino (2003)
Mandrake: A Bíblia e a Bengala (2005, novella)
O Seminarista (2009)
José (2011)

Short story collections and anthologies
 Os Prisioneiros (1963)
A Coleira do Cão (1965)
Lúcia McCartney (1967)
Feliz Ano Novo (1975)
O Homem de Fevereiro ou Março (1973)
O Cobrador (1979)
Romance Negro e Outras Histórias (1992)
Contos Reunidos (1994)
O Buraco na Parede (1995)
Romance Negro, Feliz Ano Novo e Outras Histórias (1996)
Histórias de Amor (1997)
Confraria dos Espadas (1998)
Secreções, Excreções e Desatinos (2001)
Pequenas Criaturas (2002)
64 Contos de Rubem Fonseca (2004)
Ela e Outras Mulheres (2006)
Axilas e Outras Histórias Indecorosas (2011)
 Histórias Curtas (2015)

English translations
High Art (translation by Ellen Watson, Harper & Row, New York, 1986)
Bufo & Spallanzani (translation by Clifford E. Landers, Dutton, New York, 1990)
Vast Emotions and Imperfect Thoughts (translation by Clifford Landers, Ecco Press, New York, 1998)
The Taker and Other Stories (translation by Clifford E. Landers, Open Letter, New York, 2008)
Crimes of August (translation by Clifford E. Landers of Agosto, University of Massachusetts Press, Amherst, Mass., 2014)

References

Further reading
Portuguese
Rubem Fonseca: Proibido e Consagrado / Deonísio da Silva., 1996
Os Crimes do Texto: Rubem Fonseca e a Ficção Contemporânea / Vera Follain de Figueiredo., 2003
Acercamientos a Rubem Fonseca / José Bru., 2003
No Fio do Texto: A Obra de Rubem Fonseca / Maria Antonieta Pereira., 1999
Roteiro Para um Narrador: Uma Leitura dos Contos de Rubem Fonseca / Ariovaldo José Vidal., 2000
O Realismo na Ficção de José Cardoso Pires e de Rubem Fonseca / Petar Petrov., 2000
Literatura e Consumo: O Caso Rubem Fonseca / Ana Cristina Coutinho Viegas., 2002
"O Mago Artificial", in O Estudante do Coração / Luis Carlos de Morais Junior, 2010

External links
 Writer´s official site
 Short biography, in Portuguese
 Descriptions of Fonseca's books from one distributor, in Portuguese
 Critics, in Spanish

1925 births
2020 deaths
20th-century Brazilian male writers
Brazilian male short story writers
20th-century Brazilian short story writers
Thriller writers
Camões Prize winners
People from Juiz de Fora
Writers from Rio de Janeiro (city)
20th-century Brazilian novelists
21st-century Brazilian male writers
21st-century Brazilian short story writers
21st-century Brazilian novelists
Brazilian male novelists